The rabbit (兔) is the fourth in the twelve-year periodic sequence (cycle) of animals that appear in the Chinese zodiac related to the Chinese calendar. The Year of the Rabbit is associated with the Earthly Branch symbol 卯.

In the Vietnamese zodiac and the Gurung zodiac, the cat takes the place of the rabbit. In the Malay zodiac, the mousedeer takes the place of the rabbit.

Years and elements
People born within these date ranges can be said to have been born in the "Year of the Rabbit", while also bearing the following elemental sign:

Basic astrological associations

See also
Rabbit
Niiname-no-Matsuri

References

External links

Chinese astrological signs
Mythological rabbits and hares

de:Chinesische Astrologie#Zählung ab Jahresbeginn